Xylota nitidula is a species of hoverfly in the family Syrphidae.

Distribution
Mexico.

References

Eristalinae
Insects described in 1939
Diptera of North America